Bolton Wanderers F.C. is an English association football club based in Lostock, Greater Manchester. The club was formed in Bolton in 1874 as Christ Church F.C., and played their first competitive match in October 1881, when they entered the First Round of the 1881–82 FA Cup. The club was renamed Bolton Wanderers F.C. in 1877, and they moved to Burnden Park in 1895 and the Reebok Stadium in 1997. The club won its first significant trophy in 1923 by beating West Ham United in the first FA Cup Final to be played at Wembley Stadium. Over the next forty years the club won a further three FA Cups. The club has gained promotion to the Premier League one three separate occasions; first in 1995, then again in 1997, with each term lasting for only one season on each occasion, before again gaining promotion in 2001. The club played at the highest level in English football for eleven years before relegation to the second tier in 2012.

Since playing their first competitive match, more than 850 players have made a competitive first-team appearance for the club, many of whom have played less than 25 matches (including substitute appearances).

As of February 2023, a total of 590 players have played fewer than 25 competitive matches for the club. Seven former players – C.E. Harrison, Tom Wilson, Bob Hatton, David Cross, Nicky Southall, Kaiyne Woolery and Shaun Miller – each made 24 appearances during their spell at Bolton Wanderers. Luke Mbete is the most recent player to have made their debut for the club.

List of players

 Appearances and goals are for first-team competitive matches only, including Premier League, Football League, FA Cup, League Cup, Football League Trophy, Charity Shield and UEFA Cup; wartime matches are regarded as unofficial and are excluded, as are matches from the abandoned 1939–40 season.
 Players are listed according to the date of their first team debut for the club.
Statistics correct as of match played 17 March 2023

Table headers
 Nationality – If a player played international football, the country or countries he played for are shown. Otherwise, the player's nationality is given as his country of birth.
 Bolton Wanderers career – The year of the player's first appearance for Bolton Wanderers to the year of his last appearance.
 Starts – The number of games started.
 Sub – The number of games played as a substitute.
 Total – The total number of games played, both as a starter and as a substitute.

Notes
  A utility player is one who is considered to play in more than one position.

References

 
Players (fewer than 25 appearances)
Bolton Wanderers
Association football player non-biographical articles